Abd ol Maleki may refer to:
 Abd ol Maleki, Hamadan
 Abd ol Maleki, Kermanshah
 Abd ol Maleki, Razavi Khorasan